2001 Qatar Total Fina Elf Open was a WTA tier III tennis tournament held in Doha, Qatar from 12 – 18 February 2001. Martina Hingis won in the final 6–3, 6–2 against Sandrine Testud.

Seeds
A champion seed is indicated in bold text while text in italics indicates the round in which that seed was eliminated. The top two seeds received a bye to the second round.

  Martina Hingis (champion)
  Mary Pierce (second round)
  Sandrine Testud (final)
  Barbara Schett (semifinals)
  Tamarine Tanasugarn (second round)
  Iva Majoli (withdrew)
  Rita Grande (first round)
  Joannette Kruger (quarterfinals)

Draw

Final

Section 1

Section 2

External links
 2001 Qatar Total Fina Elf Open Draw

References

2001 Qatar Total Fina Elf Open – 1
2001 WTA Tour
2001 in Qatari sport